Rittich, or Rittikh when transliterated from Russian, may refer to one of the following persons.

David Rittich (born 1992), Czech ice hockey goaltender
Eugene Rittich (1928–2006), Canadian musician
Jenõ Rittich (born 1889), Hungarian Olympic gymnast
Aleksandr Aleksandrovich Rittikh (1868–1930), Minister of Agriculture, Russian Empire
Aleksandr Fyodorovich Rittikh (born 1831), military commander and ethnographer, Russian Empire